Beyk Jan (also Romanized as Beyk Jān; also known as Bāyjān, Bāyjān-e Gechlarāt, Bāyjān Gachlarāt, Beistan, Beygjān, and Bīstān) is a village in Gejlarat-e Sharqi Rural District, Aras District, Poldasht County, West Azerbaijan Province, Iran. At the 2006 census, its population was 526, in 123 families.

References 

Populated places in Poldasht County